The 2001 Yale Bulldogs football team represented Yale University in the 2001 NCAA Division I-AA football season.  The Bulldogs were led by fifth-year head coach Jack Siedlecki, played their home games at the Yale Bowl and finished last in the Ivy League with a 1–6 record, 3–6 overall.

Like most of the Ivy League, Yale played nine games instead of the usual 10, after its September 15 season opener against Towson was canceled following the September 11 attacks. Yale averaged 25,533 fans per game.

Schedule

References

Yale
Yale Bulldogs football seasons
Yale Bulldogs football